Robert Griffiths (born 21 April 1952) is a Welsh communist activist and the current general secretary of the Communist Party of Britain. He was elected by the party's executive committee in January 1998 to replace Mike Hicks.

Early life
Griffiths was born in Cardiff and grew up in the suburb of Llanrumney, where he attended Bryn Hafod primary school. Afterwards he attended Cardiff High School, and later went to the University of Bath to study economics. While at university he competed in boxing tournaments.

Career
He joined Plaid Cymru in 1973, after being impressed by Emrys Roberts' campaign in the Merthyr Tydfil by-election. The following year in 1974, he began to work for Plaid Cymru as a parliamentary research officer. He stayed in the post until December 1979; it was a difficult year for the party, which had faced defeat in the Welsh devolution referendum and the loss of Gwynfor Evans' seat in the general election. With a reduced presence in Westminster the party had no need of a large parliamentary staff and Griffiths was made redundant.

In July 1979 he collaborated with Gareth Miles to publish Socialism for the Welsh People, a pamphlet which was critical of Plaid Cymru for its "opportunism" and alleged subservience to the British state. The pamphlet called for the creation of a Welsh Socialist Republican Movement, which was founded by Griffiths, Miles and others in January 1980. Griffiths served as the organisation's secretary and wrote for its magazine 'the Arrow'.

During George Galloway's attempt to be selected as the Labour candidate for Rhondda in the 1983 general election, Griffiths brought him along to events and introduced him to local people. However, Galloway failed to win the selection, and instead Allan Rogers stood as the Labour candidate. Rogers became the seat's MP.

The  was investigated by the police in relation to a bombing campaign and several of its members were arrested, including Robert Griffiths. However when the case was brought to trial in November 1983, Griffiths was found innocent of all charges. Partly as a result of these events, the Welsh Socialist Republican Movement dissolved. Griffiths joined the Communist Party of Great Britain shortly afterwards.

He has also previously served as Welsh president of the AUEW-TASS union.

Griffiths was a speaker at the first Communist University in Wales, and he speaks regularly at national events of the Communist Party of Britain. He has also taken part in debates at the Oxford Union, Cambridge Union Society and Manchester Debating Union.
In February 2013, Griffiths was among those who gave their support to the People's Assembly in a letter published by The Guardian newspaper. He continues to be an active supporter of the People's Assembly nationally and is also active in his local People's Assembly in Cardiff.

In 2016, Griffiths was unveiled as the chair of Left Leave, a campaign for the United Kingdom's withdrawal from the European Union. The group was a coalition of political parties and organisations such as the Communist Party of Britain, the National Union of Rail, Maritime and Transport Workers and the Respect Party.

Elections contested
European Parliament

In the 1994 election, he stood on behalf of the Communist Party in the single-member South Wales Central constituency, winning 1,073 votes or 0.6% of the total. Later on, in the 2009 and 2014 elections, he stood as part of the No2EU electoral list in the multi-member Wales constituency.

UK Parliament elections

All these elections were contested on behalf of the Communist Party.

Local elections

In 2008, he stood for the Splott ward of Cardiff council, winning 127 votes, or 3.4% of the total.

Selected publications

References

1952 births
Living people
Alumni of the University of Bath
British Eurosceptics
Communist Party of Britain members
Communist Party of Great Britain members
Leaders of political parties in the United Kingdom
People educated at Cardiff High School
Plaid Cymru politicians
Politicians from Cardiff
Welsh communists